Friedrich Leopold Harry von Rochow (12 August 1881 – 17 August 1945) was a German horse rider who competed in the 1912 Summer Olympics. He was part of the German team, which won the silver medal in the equestrian team event, also he won the silver medal in the individual event.

References

External links
profile

1881 births
1945 deaths
German event riders
Olympic equestrians of Germany
German male equestrians
Equestrians at the 1912 Summer Olympics
Olympic silver medalists for Germany
Olympic medalists in equestrian
Medalists at the 1912 Summer Olympics
German Army personnel of World War I
German prisoners of war in World War I
World War I prisoners of war held by Russia